Ujjwal Raman Singh is an Indian politician and a former member of Uttar Pradesh Legislative Assembly. He represents the Karachana constituency of Uttar Pradesh and is a member of the Samajwadi party. He is the son of senior Samajwadi party leader Rewati Raman Singh.

Political career

Ujjwal Raman Singh belongs to the Bhumihar Brahmin community. He was elected as an MLA from Karachana in 2004 on Samajwadi Party's ticket as his father left the seat after becoming an MP.

Singh had also served the state as the environment minister in Mulayam Singh Yadav's government and launched Compressed natural gas in Agra, Lucknow and Kanpur. He also served as Chairman of 'Beej Vikas Nigam'. He was re-elected in 2017 assembly election as an MLA again from Karachana. His victory was important for his party because he was the only candidate who won from Samajwadi Party in Allahabad and nearby constituencies.

Posts held

See also
Uttar Pradesh Legislative Assembly

References

Uttar Pradesh MLAs 2017–2022
Bharatiya Janata Party politicians from Uttar Pradesh
Living people
Year of birth missing (living people)